Pío Gullón e Iglesias (1835 in Astorga, Spain – 22 November 1917, in Madrid, Spain) was a Spanish lawyer, journalist and politician who served three times as Minister of State.

|-

|-

|-

1835 births
1917 deaths
Foreign ministers of Spain
Liberal Party (Spain, 1880) politicians
Governors of the Bank of Spain